Morenci Unified School District is a school district headquartered in Morenci, Arizona, United States.

In addition to Morenci, the district includes Clifton.

In 2022 Jennifer Morales became the superintendent. She was the first woman to ever have this position.

Schools
Morenci High School
Fairbanks Middle School
Metcalf Elementary School.

References

School districts in Greenlee County, Arizona